Wende may refer to:

Die Wende (1989–1990), the historical period around German reunification.
Wende Museum, a museum and educational institution in Culver City, California, United States
Wende, Alabama, an unincorporated community in Russell County, Alabama, United States
Wende, New York, a hamlet in the town of Alden in Erie County, New York, United States
Wende Correctional Facility, a maximum security prison
Wende Station, a station on the Taipei Metro in Taiwan
Wende–Bauckus syndrome or Pegum syndrome, a medical condition
Wende horn, a runic symbol
Wende (album), a 1976 Ran Blake recording

People
Wende (singer) or Wende Snijders (born 1978), Dutch singer
Empress Wende or Empress Zhangsun, (601–636), of the Tang dynasty China
Bruno Wende (1859–1929), American soldier who received the Medal of Honor 
Daniel Wende (born 1984), German figure skater
František Wende (1904–1968), Czechoslovak skier 
Gottfried H. Wende (1852-1933), American politician from New York 
Horst Wende (1919—1996), German bandleader, arranger and composer
Philipp Wende (born 1985), German rower
Richard Vander Wende, American visual and video game designer 
Wende Wagner (1941–1997), American actress

See also
Wenden (disambiguation)
Wends
Wendi (disambiguation)
Wendy (disambiguation)

Ethnonymic surnames